The Grapes of Life is the 1987 studio album by the noted and influential British folk guitarist, singer and songwriter Wizz Jones.

Track listing
"The Grapes of Life" (Alan Tunbridge)     
"Happiness was Free" (Wizz Jones)
"Corrinne" (Blind Boy Fuller)
"Touch Has a Memory" (Pete Atkin, Clive James)  
"Moving On Song" (Ewan MacColl)
"Needle of Death" (Bert Jansch)
"First Girl I Loved" (Robin Williamson)
"Do What You Please" (Steve Tilston)
" 'Bout a Spoonful" (Mance Lipscomb)
"Letter From West Germany" (Wizz Jones)
"Dark-eyed Gypsies" (Traditional via Davey Graham; arranged by Wizz Jones)
"Planet Without a Plan" (Wizz Jones)

Label details
Label       = Run River
Catalogue # = RR A005

Production
Recorded and Produced by Michael Klein at Heartbeat Sound, London.

Wizz Jones albums
1987 albums